The Sweden national under-19 speedway team is the national under-19 speedway team of Sweden and is controlled by the SVEMO. The team has won the Team Speedway Junior European Championship once in 2008. Sweden has produced two Individual U-19 European Champion - Antonio Lindbäck (2004) and Dennis Andersson (2010). Lindbäck won a bronze medal also, just like Daniel Davidsson, Fredrik Lindgren and Robert Pettersson.

Competition

See also 
 Sweden national speedway team
 Sweden national under-21 speedway team

External links 
 (ru) Motorcycle Federation of Russia webside

National speedway teams
Speedway